From Italy's Shores is a 1915 American short drama film featuring Harold Lloyd.

Cast
 Roy Stewart
 Jane Novak 
 Harold Lloyd

See also
 Harold Lloyd filmography

References

External links

1915 films
1915 short films
American silent short films
1915 drama films
American black-and-white films
Films directed by Otis Turner
Silent American drama films
Universal Pictures short films
1910s American films